Athans is a surname. Notable people with the surname include:

Gary Athans (born 1961), Canadian alpine skier
George Athans (born 1952), Canadian water skier
George Athans (diver) (1921–2007), Canadian diver
Gina Athans (born 1984), South African model
Michael Athans (1937–2020), Greek engineer
Peter Athans (born 1957), American mountain climber
Philip Athans (born 1964), American writer
Tom Athans (born 1961), American businessman
Chris Athans (born 1996), American professional skateboarder

See also
Athan